Enchanted Storybook Castle is a castle in Shanghai Disneyland. Similarly to the Castle of Magical Dreams in Hong Kong Disneyland, it represents all of the Disney Princesses and not only one.  Additionally, it is the tallest castle in all of the related Disney theme parks. It replaced Walt Disney World’s Cinderella Castle as the tallest castle in any Disney Park.

The look of Enchanted Storybook Castle was inspired by many other Disney Castles, including Cinderella Castle and Sleeping Beauty Castle. Features include a walk-through attraction, a Disney character dining restaurant, and a boat-themed attraction inside the castle. On the tallest tower, there is a peony flower sculpture to represent Shanghai, giving voice to the motto of the Theme Park:  'Authentically Disney, Distinctly Chinese.'

Shanghai Disney Resort is the first Disney Park resort in Mainland China and the third in Asia.

See also

 Sleeping Beauty Castle
 Le Château de la Belle au Bois Dormant
 Cinderella Castle
 Castle of Magical Dreams

References

External links
 Official website

Disney Princess
Frozen (franchise)
Shanghai Disneyland
Fantasyland
Walt Disney Parks and Resorts attractions
Walt Disney Parks and Resorts icons
2016 establishments in China